Hays House or Hayes House may refer to:

Places in the United States named Hays House (without an E) (by state):
Brady Hays Homestead, Denmark, Arkansas, listed on the National Register of Historic Places (NRHP) in White County
Ward-Hays House, Little Rock, Arkansas, NRHP-listed
Samuel Hays House, Boise, Idaho, NRHP-listed in Ada County
E.R. Hays House, Knoxville, Iowa, NRHP-listed in Marion County
Seth Hays House, Council Grove, Kansas, listed on the NRHP in Morris County
James Hays House, Hays, Kentucky, listed on the NRHP in Warren County
Hays House (Bel Air, Maryland), NRHP-listed
Joseph C. Hays House, Sharpsburg, Maryland, NRHP-listed
Hays-Heighe House, Bel Air, Maryland, NRHP-listed
Hays House (Lorman, Mississippi), NRHP-listed
Daniel Boone Hays House, Defiance 	Missouri, listed on the NRHP in St. Charles County
George Hays House, Jerusalem, New York, NRHP-listed
John R. Hays House, Walden, New York, NRHP-listed
Hays-Kiser House, Antioch, Tennessee, listed on the NRHP in Davidson County
Hays-Pitzer House, Martinsburg, West Virginia, listed on the NRHP in Berkeley County
Hays-Gerrard House, Gerrardstown, West Virginia, listed on the NRHP in Berkeley County

Places in the United States named Hayes House (with an E) (by state):
Hayes Mansion, San Jose, California, NRHP-listed
Samuel Hayes II House, Granby, Connecticut, listed on the NRHP in Hartford County, Connecticut
Dr. David Brandon House, Thomasville, Georgia, also known as Hayes House, NRHP-listed in Thomas County 
Jarrett-Hayes House, Toccoa, Georgia, listed on the NRHP in Stephens County
William B. Hayes House, Des Moines, Iowa, listed on the NRHP in Park County
Samuel T. Hayes House, Lexington, Kentucky, listed on the NRHP in Fayette County
Hayes Voting House No. 16, Morehead, Kentucky, listed on the NRHP in Rowan County 
Needham-Hayes House, Le Sueur, Minnesota, listed on the NRHP in Le Sueur County
Richard Hayes House, Rochester, New Hampshire, listed on the NRHP in Strafford County
Hayes House (Altamont, New York), NRHP-listed
Hayes-Byrum Store and House, Charlotte, North Carolina, listed on the NRHP in Mecklenburg County
Hayes Plantation, Edenton, North Carolina, NRHP-listed
Rutherford B. Hayes House, Fremont, Ohio, a U.S. National Historic Landmark
Jacob Hayes House, Newlin Twp., Pennsylvania, listed on the NRHP in southern Chester County
Hayes Mill House, Newlin Twp., Pennsylvania, listed on the NRHP in southern Chester County
Hayes Homestead, Newlin Twp., Pennsylvania, listed on the NRHP in southern Chester County
John Hayes Farmstead, Latta, South Carolina, listed on the NRHP in Dillon County

Places in Canada named Hays House:
 Hays House, Montreal, Quebec (destroyed in 1852)

See also
 Hay House (disambiguation)